200 Squadron may refer to:

100 Squadron (Israel)
No. 200 Squadron RAF, United Kingdom
200th Aero Squadron, Air Service, United States Army
200th Airlift Squadron, United States Air Force
VPB-200, United States Navy

See also
Kampfgeschwader 200